Gordius aquaticus is a species of Gordius.

The species was described in 1758 by Carolus Linnaeus.

It has cosmopolitan distribution.

References

External links

Nematomorpha
Taxa named by Carl Linnaeus